The Mount Toby Formation is a geologic formation in Massachusetts. It preserves fossils dating back to the Jurassic period.

See also

 List of fossiliferous stratigraphic units in Massachusetts
 Paleontology in Massachusetts

References
 

Jurassic Massachusetts